James Hargrave Alcock Schofield (February 19, 1866 – December 9, 1938) was a lumberman and political figure in British Columbia. He represented Ymir from 1907 to 1916, Trail from 1916 to 1924 and Rossland-Trail from 1924 to 1933 in the Legislative Assembly of British Columbia as a Conservative.

He was born in Brockville, Canada West, the son of Frederick Schofield and Letitia L. Hargrave, and the grandson of Letitia MacTavish Hargrave. He was educated in Port Hope. Schofield was mayor of Trail from 1902 to 1907.

He died at his home in Trail on December 9, 1938.

References

External links 
 

1866 births
1938 deaths
British Columbia Conservative Party MLAs
Mayors of places in British Columbia
Pre-Confederation Ontario people